Metamorphosis is the fourth studio album by Culture Beat. It was released by Columbia Records on 1 May 1998. The record includes three singles.

Track listing 
"Pay No Mind"
"You Belong"
"Faith in Your Heart"
"Blue Skies"
"Rendez-Vous"
"Guardian Angel"
"Electrify Me"
"Pray for Redemption"
"This Is My Time"
"Do You Really Know"
"Language of Love"
"Metamorphosis"

Personnel
Producer – Frank Bülow (tracks: 9), Matiz (tracks: 11), Nino Tielman* (tracks: 1 to 4, 12), Perky Park (tracks: 5 to 8, 10), Peter Gräber (tracks: 1 to 4, 9, 12)
Peter Zweier (tracks: 11) 
Vocals – Kim Sanders

References

External links
Official website

1998 albums
Culture Beat albums
Columbia Records albums